In Concert is a double live album by the band Blood, Sweat & Tears, that was released in Europe and Japan in 1976. This album was remixed and released in the United States as Live and Improvised in 1991 by Columbia/Legacy and again in 2012 as "In Concert" by Wounded Bird. This collection was recorded live at four different venues over five nights during the summer of 1975. The lineup for this album is the same as the New City album they were supporting on that tour with the exception of Steve Khan and Mike Stern on guitar.

The songs in this collection were recorded at the Schaeffer Music Festival in New York City; City Hall Plaza in Boston Recorded on the Record Plant NY Remote Truck; National Arts Centre in Ottawa, Ontario; and at the Monterey Jazz Festival in Monterey, California.

Track listing
Side One
 Introduction – 0:22 	
 "Spinning Wheel" (David Clayton-Thomas) – 5:22 	
 "I Love You More Than You'll Ever Know" (Al Kooper) – 8:30 	
 "Lucretia Mac Evil" (David Clayton-Thomas) – 6:57 	
Side Two	
 "And When I Die" (Laura Nyro) – 6:27 
 "One Room Country Shack" (John Lee Hooker) – 2:40 	
 "And When I Die (Reprise)" (Laura Nyro) – 2:41 	
 "(I Can Recall) Spain" (Chick Corea) – 8:35 
Side Three	
 "Hi-De-Ho" (Gerry Goffin, Carole King) – 6:17 	
 "Unit Seven" (Sam Jones) – 10:12 	
 "Life" (Allen Toussaint) – 5:03 	
Side Four
 "Mean Ole World" (Jerry LaCroix) – 9:06 	
 "Ride Captain Ride" (Carlos Pinera, Franke Konte) – 6:12 	
 "You've Made Me So Very Happy" (Berry Gordy Jr., Brenda Holloway, Frank Wilson, Patrice Holloway) – 5:16

Personnel

David Clayton-Thomas – Lead vocals
Bobby Colomby - Drum, Background vocals
Dave Bargeron - Trombone, Tuba, Percussion, Background vocals
Larry Willis – Keyboards, Background vocals
Bill Tillman – Saxophone, Flute, Background vocals
Anthony Klatka - Trumpet, Background vocals
Joe Giorgianni – Trumpet, Background vocals
Steve Khan - Guitar, Background vocals at Schaeffer Music Festival; City Hall Plaza
Georg Wadenius – Guitar, Background vocals at the National Arts Centre
Mike Stern - Guitar, Background vocals at Monterey Jazz Festival
Ron McClure – Bass
Don Alias - Percussion, Background vocals

Production notes

Jimmy Ienner – Executive Producer
Bobby Colomby – Producer
Recorded at the following locations:
July 5, 1975 – Schaeffer Music Festival in New York City
July 20, 1975 – City Hall Plaza in Boston
August 11, 12, 1975 – National Arts Centre in Ottawa, Ontario
September 21, 1975 – Monterey Jazz Festival in Monterey, California

Blood, Sweat & Tears albums
1976 live albums
Columbia Records live albums
Albums produced by Bobby Colomby
Albums produced by Jimmy Ienner